Mary Brown Austin (1768–1824) had dramatic influence on early Texas history.  Perhaps her most important contribution to history is writing a letter to her son, Stephen, two days before the death of her husband, Moses Austin, imploring Stephen F. Austin to carry out the dying wish of his father—that Stephen follow through with the empresario grants for land settlement in Texas. As such, Mary Brown Austin had a significant role in the shaping and development of Texas.

Family
Mary was born to Abia Brown and Margaret (Sharp) Brown, at Sharpsborough Furnace, New Jersey, on January 1, 1768.  She had eight siblings and she lived the longest.  Her father, Abia Brown, had served as a deputy in the provincial congresses of 1775 and 1776.  Her father had significant real estate holdings related to iron mining and smelting.

After the death of her mother, Abia asked Benjamin Fuller to board Mary and one of her sisters.  Fuller was connected to Abia by marriage into the Sharp family and actually was her uncle. Stephen F. Austin's middle name is credited to his great uncle, Benjamin Fuller.

Mary Brown Austin was the mother of Stephen F. Austin and Emily Austin Perry, James Elijah Brown Austin, and wife of Moses Austin.  Her grandchildren include Guy Morrison Bryan, Stephen Samuel Perry, William Joel Bryan, and Moses Austin Bryan.  Her daughter Emily was first married to James Bryan and later to James F. Perry.

Names

Mary was also known by the names:

Miss Maria Brown
Miss Mary Brown
Maria Brown Austin
Mary Brown Austin
Maria Brown Austin
Maria (Mary) Austin Brown. She liked to be called "Maria" (pronounced differently than typical for this particular spelling; the enunciation is like that of the first name of the singer Mariah Carey).
Mary Brown
Mary Austin
Mary
Maria

Death

Mary is buried in Potosi, Missouri, alongside her husband who founded Potosi.

References

Eugene C. Barker, ed., The Austin Papers (3 vols., Washington: GPO, 1924–28). David B. Gracy II, Moses Austin: His Life (San Antonio: Trinity University Press, 1987).

1768 births
1824 deaths
People from Sussex County, New Jersey
People from Potosi, Missouri